1973 Non-Aligned Movement Standing Committee Conference took place on 13-15 May 1973 in Kabul, the capital city of Afghanistan. The country participated in the work of the movement since the 1st Summit of the Non-Aligned Movement in Belgrade in 1961. Afghanistan perceived Non-Alignment as a guaranty of peace in independence in the context in which the country shared a long border both with Soviet Union and CENTO member states. The 1973 meeting was opened by the Minister of Foreign Affairs of Afghanistan Mohammad Musa Shafiq. While serving as a host country, Afghanistan decided to nevertheless play marginal role in the event concerned how its more prominent role may be perceived by major powers. Delegation of Sri Lanka proposed Colombo as the host of the 5th Summit of the Non-Aligned Movement which was strongly supported by SFR Yugoslavia. Panama joined the NAM as an observer, while Bangladesh, despite reservations by Pakistan, joined as a full member state. Yugoslavia supported unofficial interest by Australia and North Korea to attend the next meeting with observer status. India, Guyana and SFR Yugoslavia played particularly active role in preparation of the working materials for the following summit in Algeria. Chile proposed inclusion of discussion on measures against global corporate threats and measures to protect sovereign control over natural resources. In July of the same year the host country was faced with 1973 Afghan coup d'état after which the new authorities stated their intention to maintain country's non-aligned position.

See also
 4th Summit of the Non-Aligned Movement
 Finlandization

References

Committee
Foreign relations of Afghanistan
Kabul
1973 conferences
1973 in politics
1973 in Afghanistan
International conferences